Dąbrówka Warszawska  is a village in the administrative district of Gmina Wierzbica, in Radom County, Masovian Voivodeship, in east-central Poland.

References

Villages in Radom County